The Flying Start Challenge is a contest run by Aerospace businesses and organisations in the South West of England for local secondary schools to help develop science and engineering skills whilst highlighting the opportunities available in a career in engineering. The Challenge has been running for more than a decade, involving more than 500 students from 30+ schools.

The sponsoring companies are Leonardo, Airbus, Atkins, GKN Aerospace, BAE Systems, MBDA, Triumph, Rolls-Royce and Safran Landing Systems.

The Challenge is open to pupils in Years 7 to 9 who are organised into teams of 4 with the aim of "designing and building a hand-launched glider made from sustainable materials". Each team is supported by graduates, apprentices and trainees from the sponsor companies, with lessons on design, manufacture and testing, in addition to some practical advice on their glider designs.

Each team has the opportunity to fly their glider at a Regional Finals. Teams will be judged both on the distance flown and on a poster presentation detailing the design decisions made. Regional Finals are held in Bristol, Gloucestershire and Yeovil.

The winning teams from the Regional Final progress to the Grand Final held at the Fleet Air Arm Museum at Yeovilton. The teams take part in a series of engineering challenges organised by the companies involved and compete to be named the best team. The winning team receive free glider flights with the winning school awarded a voucher for £1000 of Science, Technology, Engineering and Mathematics (STEM) equipment. Second place receives £500, third place £250.

References

External links 
The Flying Start Challenge Official Website
Flying Start Challenge Twitter

Aerospace industry in the United Kingdom
Engineering education in the United Kingdom
Educational projects
Secondary schools in England
Science and technology in Gloucestershire
Science and technology in Somerset
United Kingdom educational programs
Youth science